The 30th Robert Awards ceremony was held on 28 February 2013 in Copenhagen, Denmark. Organized by the Danish Film Academy, the awards honoured the best in Danish and foreign film of 2012.

Honorees

Best Danish Film 
 A Hijacking

Best Children's Film 
 You & Me Forever - Kaspar Munk

Best Director 
 Nikolaj Arcel – A Royal Affair

Best Screenplay 
 Tobias Lindholm – A Hijacking

Best Actor in a Leading Role 
 Søren Malling – A Hijacking

Best Actress in a Leading Role 
 Bodil Jørgensen for Hvidsten gruppen & Trine Dyrholm for Love Is All You Need

Best Actor in a Supporting Role 
 Mikkel Boe Følsgaard – A Royal Affair

Best Actress in a Supporting Role 
 Trine Dyrholm – A Royal Affair

Best Production Design 
 Niels Sejer – A Royal Affair

Best Cinematography 
 Rasmus Videbæk – A Royal Affair

Best Costume Design 
 Manon Rasmussen – A Royal Affair

Best Makeup 
 Ivo Strangmüller & Dennis Knudsen – A Royal Affair

Best Editing 
 Adam Nielsen – A Hijacking

Best Sound Design 
 Morten Green – A Hijacking

Best Score 
 Gabriel Yared & Cyrille Aufort – A Royal Affair

Best Special Effects 
 Jeppe Nygaard Christensen, Esben Syberg & Rikke Hovgaard Jørgensen – A Royal Affair

Best Song 
 "Sangen om Gummi T – Hvem ved hvad der er op og ned" with Annika Aakjær, Halfdan E & Søren Siegumfeldt – Gummi T

Best Short Fiction/Animation 
 Dyret – Malene Choi

Best Long Fiction/Animation 
 Sort kaffe & vinyl – Jesper Bernt

Best Documentary Short 
 Kongens Foged -

Best Documentary Feature 
 The Act of Killing – Joshua Oppenheimer

Best Danish Television Series 
 Forbrydelsen 3 – Mikkel Serup

Best Actor in a Leading Television Role 
 Nikolaj Lie Kaas – Forbrydelsen 3

Best Actress in a Leading Television Role 
 Sofie Gråbøl – Forbrydelsen 3

Best Actor in a Supporting Television Role 
 Olaf Johannessen – Forbrydelsen 3

Supporting Television Actress 
 Birthe Neumann – Julestjerner

Best American Film 
 Argo – Ben Affleck

Best Non-American Film 
 Amour – Michael Haneke

Best Foreign TV Series 
 Homeland season 2

Audience Award 
 Hvidsten gruppen – as "YouBio Publikumsprisen – Drama"
 Love Is All You Need – as "YouBio Publikumsprisen – Komedie"
  – as "YouBio Publikumsprisen – Børne- og Ungdomsfilm"
 Forbrydelsen 3 – as "YouBio Publikumsprisen – Tv-serie"

The Ib Award 
 Ronnie Fridthjof

See also 

 2013 Bodil Awards

References

External links 
  

2012 film awards
Robert Awards ceremonies
2013 in Copenhagen
February 2013 events in Europe